Stegna is a village and municipality seat in Pomeranian Voivodeship, northern Poland.

Stegna may also refer to the following places:
Stegna, Mława County in Masovian Voivodeship (east-central Poland)
Stegna, Przasnysz County in Masovian Voivodeship (east-central Poland)
Stegna, Sochaczew County in Masovian Voivodeship (east-central Poland)